The 1998 French Grand Prix was a Formula One motor race held at Magny-Cours on 28 June 1998. It was the eighth race of the 1998 FIA Formula One World Championship.

The 71-lap race was won by German driver Michael Schumacher, driving a Ferrari. It was Schumacher's third victory of the season. Northern Irish teammate Eddie Irvine finished second, with Finn Mika Häkkinen third in a McLaren-Mercedes, having started from pole position.

Report

Background
The race was originally dropped due to a dispute over television broadcasting rights in France. Though TF1 had the rights, rival channel France 3 obtained a judgement from a French court to allow all channels to operate on the grounds of the circuit.

Jos Verstappen replaced Jan Magnussen at the Stewart team for the remainder of the season.

Qualifying
Mika Häkkinen of McLaren-Mercedes took pole position, beating Michael Schumacher by 0.2 seconds. David Coulthard qualified third, and Eddie Irvine took fourth place. Throughout the qualifying session, Schumacher and Häkkinen exchanged first place, until Häkkinen finally took the pole.

Race
At the beginning of the race, Verstappen stalled his Stewart, meaning that a restart was required. At the second start, Häkkinen was overtaken by Michael Schumacher and Irvine. Schumacher then began to pull away, sometimes at one second a lap, with Irvine holding both the McLarens behind him. On lap 20, Häkkinen tried an ambitious move on Irvine. His attempt failed, and he spun into the gravel trap. However, he managed to keep his car going, pitted for fresh tyres, and rejoined in fourth place. However, he regained third place when Coulthard had problems with his pit stop. Coulthard went into the pits, but due to a fuel filling problem, had to do another lap, and then go into the pits again. After this second set of pits, Häkkinen was back behind Irvine, and Schumacher was some way in front. On the final lap, on the final corner, Häkkinen made an attempt to overtake Irvine, after Irvine was very slow through the chicane before the final corner. Irvine just held off Häkkinen to take second, by only a tenth of a second. However, both drivers were 19 seconds behind Schumacher. After Coulthard's misfortune in the pitlane, he finished sixth, scoring one world championship point. It was Ferrari's first one-two for 8 years, the previous being at the 1990 Spanish Grand Prix, Alain Prost and Nigel Mansell scoring the one-two.

Classification

Qualifying

Race

Championship standings after the race

Drivers'  Championship standings

Constructors' Championship standings

References

French Grand Prix
Grand Prix
French Grand Prix
French Grand Prix